Wang Lang Market is a daily market in Bangkok Noi district next to Siriraj Hospital and Chao Phraya river in Bangkok's Thonburi side.

The name "Wang Lang Market" means rear palace market, because of its location. In the early Rattanakosin period in the reign of King Rama I was the site of the palace of Prince Anurak Devesh (พระราชวังบวรสถานพิมุข หรือ วังหลัง; Rajawang Boworn Sathan Phimuk; familiarly known as Wang Lang ("Rear Palace"), as commoners often used the name of the palace to refer to its owner) who was the nephew of the king. At present, there are remnants of the palace walls in the area near the market.

Wang Lang Market located in a narrow lane, it connects between Siriraj pier (or Wang Lang pier) and Arun Amarin road. Opposite to Tha Pra Chan pier in Tha Phra Chan neighbourhood, beside to Thammasat University in Phra Nakhon district. The length is about 300 meters. But it is full of shops either stalls and shophouses. There are varieties of products such as fashion clothings, beauty salons, bakeries, sushi shops, restaurants, including café in boutique style. But what is very famous of this market are southern food restaurants, which the food is well known for its spicy flavor.  Because of its location near Thon Buri railway station, which is the destination of the southern line. And at the nearby Phran Nok intersection, there are also many southern food restaurants.

References

External links

Retail markets in Bangkok
Bangkok Noi district
Buildings and structures on the Chao Phraya River
Food markets